Peter Facinelli (born November 26, 1973) is an American actor and film and television producer. He starred as Donovan "Van" Ray on the Fox series Fastlane from 2002 to 2003. He played Dr. Carlisle Cullen in the film adaptations of the Twilight novel series, and is also known for his role as Mike Dexter in the 1998 film Can't Hardly Wait. Facinelli was a regular on the Showtime comedy-drama series Nurse Jackie, portraying the role of Dr. Fitch "Coop" Cooper. He portrayed Maxwell Lord on the first season of the TV series Supergirl.

Early life
Facinelli grew up in Ozone Park, Queens, the son of Italian immigrants Bruna (née Reich), a homemaker, and Pierino Facinelli, a waiter. His parents are from the Val di Non valley in Trentino, northern Italy. His father is from Revò, while his mother is from Spormaggiore. He was raised Catholic and attended St. Francis Preparatory School in Fresh Meadows, New York.

He studied acting at New York University, as well as at the Atlantic Theater Company Acting School in New York City.

Career
Facinelli made his feature film debut in Rebecca Miller's Angela in 1995 and came to the attention of critics in the TV-movie The Price of Love later that year. In 1996, Facinelli played opposite his then-future wife Jennie Garth in An Unfinished Affair. Other TV roles followed, including a part in After Jimmy (1996) and a college dropout in Calm at Sunset. Facinelli co-starred with Amanda Peet and Michael Vartan in the 1997 AIDS-themed drama Touch Me (1997) and co-starred as a high school student in two 1998 features with Ethan Embry and Breckin Meyer, Dancer, Texas Pop. 81, and Can't Hardly Wait, which starred Jennifer Love Hewitt.

Facinelli appeared in the sci-fi film Supernova starring James Spader in 2000. He made appearances in Riding in Cars with Boys in 2001 and The Scorpion King in 2002, followed by a leading role in the Fox drama Fastlane. Facinelli had a recurring role in the HBO series Six Feet Under in 2004 and a role in the FX original series Damages beginning in 2007. Facinelli starred in Hollow Man 2 with Christian Slater. It was released direct-to-video in May 2006.

In 2006, he was cast in Touch the Top of the World, a true story of Erik Weihenmayer, the first blind person to climb Mount Everest. The film is based on his best selling autobiography.

After wrapping up Finding Amanda with Matthew Broderick, Facinelli played Carlisle Cullen in the film adaptation of Twilight, based on the book by Stephenie Meyer. According to an interview, "I almost didn't read for Twilight. My agent said, 'Do you want to do a vampire movie?' And I was like, 'No.' I was totally thinking blood and guts and bats in caves, like some kind of horror movie. They literally talked me into reading the book and I actually enjoyed the book a lot." Facinelli continued his portrayal in the sequels of the film, The Twilight Saga: New Moon, The Twilight Saga: Eclipse, The Twilight Saga: Breaking Dawn – Part 1, and The Twilight Saga: Breaking Dawn – Part 2.

He played Dr. Fitch Cooper for seven seasons on the Showtime dark comedy series Nurse Jackie.

He is the founder of the production company Facinelli Films. Their first feature film, Loosies, which was written entirely by Facinelli, was filmed in 2011. He starred in the film, which is a story of a New York pickpocket that being produced by Verdi Corrente Productions. In 2011 he also wrote and produced the Hallmark Channel telefilm Accidentally in Love which starred his then-wife Jennie Garth. In 2015, he played Maxwell Lord in Supergirl.

In 2015 Facinelli co-wrote the novel After the Red Rain with Barry Lyga and Robert DeFranco. It is set on a future Earth whose population is grappling with dwindling resources.

Personal life
Facinelli met actress Jennie Garth on the set of An Unfinished Affair in 1995. Facinelli and Garth married on January 20, 2001, in a traditional Catholic ceremony. They have three daughters. In March 2012, Facinelli filed for divorce from Garth, which was finalized in June 2013.

Facinelli began dating actress Jaimie Alexander in 2012 after meeting on the set of Loosies. They became engaged in March 2015, and announced they had ended their engagement in February 2016.

On January 1, 2020, he became engaged to Lily Anne Harrison. Lily Anne gave birth to their first child together, a son named Jack Cooper, in September 2022. 

He is a Catholic. In 2009, Facinelli acquired Italian citizenship through jus sanguinis in order to shoot a film in Europe, which required that all actors be European citizens. Cyclist Letizia Paternoster is Facinelli's niece.

Filmography

Film

Television

References

External links

 
 
 

1973 births
20th-century American male actors
21st-century American male actors
American male film actors
American male television actors
American people of Italian descent
Living people
Male actors from New York City
Participants in American reality television series
People from Ozone Park, Queens
St. Francis Preparatory School alumni
New York University Gallatin School of Individualized Study alumni
Tisch School of the Arts alumni
Catholics from New York (state)